The 1975 Cal State Fullerton Titans baseball team represented California State University, Fullerton in the 1975 NCAA Division I baseball season. The Titans played their home games at Titan Field, and played as part of the Pacific Coast Athletic Association. The team was coached by Augie Garrido in his third season as head coach at Cal State Fullerton.

The Titans reached the College World Series, their first appearance in Omaha, where they finished tied for seventh place after losing two games to eventual champion Texas and fourth place .

Personnel

Roster

Coaches

Schedule and results

References

Cal State Fullerton Titans baseball seasons
Cal State Fullerton Titans
College World Series seasons
Cal State Fullerton Titans baseball
Big West Conference baseball champion seasons